In mathematics, a Fricke involution is the involution of the modular curve X0(N) given by τ → –1/Nτ. It is named after Robert Fricke. The Fricke involution also acts on other objects associated with the modular curve, such as spaces of modular forms and the Jacobian J0(N) of the modular curve.

See also

Atkin–Lehner involution

References

Modular forms